Peter Arnold may refer to:
Peter Arnold (cricketer) (1926–2021), New Zealand cricketer
Peter Arnold (politician) (born 1935), Australian politician
Peter Arnold (musician), British piano professor